Welshman or The Welshman may refer to:
 any male Welsh person
 The Welshman, one of two named passenger railway trains
 The Welshman (newspaper), defunct weekly (1832–1984)
 Adam the Welshman, bishop of St. Asaph
 Welshman Ncube (born 1961), Zimbabwean politician and lawyer

See also
 Welchman, an English surname
 Welshmen Act 1402, repealed English law